This is a list of Estonian football transfers in the summer transfer window 2014 by club. Only transfers in Meistriliiga are included.

Meistriliiga

Levadia

In: 

Out:

Nõmme Kalju

In: 

Out:

Sillamäe Kalev

In: 

Out:

Flora

In:

Out:

Paide

In: 

Out:

Infonet

In: 

Out:

Trans

In: 

Out:

Tallinna Kalev

In: 

Out:

Tammeka

In: 

Out:

Lokomotiv

In: 

Out:

See also
 2014 Meistriliiga

References

External links
 Official site of the Estonian Football Association
 Meistriliiga transfers at Soccernet.ee

Estonian
transfers
2014